Tijuana Panthers are an American surf rock band from Long Beach, California consisting of Daniel Michicoff (bass/vocals), Chad Wachtel (guitar/vocals) and Phil Shaheen (drums/vocals).

Discography

Studio albums 
 Semi-Sweet (2013)
 Wayne Interest (2014)
 Poster (2015)
 Max Baker (2015)
 Carpet Denim (2019)
 Halfway to Eighty (2022)

Extended plays 
 Tijuana (2008)

References

External links 
 

Psychedelic rock music groups from California
Musical groups established in 2013
Garage rock groups from California
2013 establishments in California